The 2003–04 Duke Blue Devils men's basketball team represented Duke University. The head coach was Mike Krzyzewski, who served for his 24th year at Duke.  The team played its home games in Cameron Indoor Stadium in Durham, North Carolina, and was a member of the Atlantic Coast Conference.

Roster

Schedule and results

|-
!colspan=9 style=|Regular season

|-
!colspan=9 style=| ACC tournament

|-
!colspan=9 style=| NCAA tournament

Team players drafted into the NBA
*Immediately traded to the Chicago Bulls through prior agreement

References

Duke Blue Devils
Duke Blue Devils men's basketball seasons
NCAA Division I men's basketball tournament Final Four seasons
Duke
Duke
Duke